A visual dictionary is a dictionary that primarily uses pictures to illustrate the meaning of words.  Visual dictionaries are often organized by themes, instead of being an alphabetical list of words.  For each theme, an image is labeled with the correct word to identify each component of the item in question.  Visual dictionaries can be monolingual or multilingual, providing the names of items in several languages.  An index of all defined words is usually included to assist finding the correct illustration that defines the word.

Some international visual dictionary publishers include Oxford University Press and Dorling Kindersley.

See also
Picture dictionary
Knowledge visualization
Visual language

External links
Visual Thematic Dictionary – Merriam Webster
Purushottam's FUNKIDS Picture Dictionary
 Visual Video Dictionary – Cliptionary

Dictionaries by type